In mathematics, the Laguerre form is generally given as a third degree tensor-valued form, that can be written as,

.

Tensors